Claude Jeannerot (born April 10, 1945) was a member of the Senate of France, representing the Doubs department. He is a member of the Socialist Party.

References
Page on the Senate website

1945 births
Living people
French Senators of the Fifth Republic
Knights of the Ordre national du Mérite
Socialist Party (France) politicians
Senators of Doubs